Maurizio Giglio (20 December 1920 - 24 March 1944) was an Italian soldier and policeman. In September 1943, during World War II, the Italian government concluded an armistice with the Allies. He thereafter transmitted military intelligence by radio from Rome about the Nazi forces there to the Allied forces advancing through southern Italy. In March 1944, he was captured, and was executed by the Nazis. He was posthumously awarded the Gold Medal of Military Valour, a decoration which acknowledges deeds of outstanding gallantry. Places have been named, and memorials dedicated, in his honour.

Biography

Early years
Giglio was born into a middle-class family from Rome. His parents were Armando and Anna. He had a sister, Giulia Adriani, who outlived him by many years.

Maurizio spent his boyhood between France and Rome. He was a keen sportsman: hunting, skiing, swimming, mountaineering, and motoring.

Secret agent
He began a double life. To public eyes - and, most importantly, to German and to Italian collaborationist eyes - he was a uniformed police officer. In private, he created a network of informants. A priest helped him by concealing the radio transmitter in his own church. He watched for German troop movements by road and rail, and passed his observations on to the Allies using his radio transmitter (nicknamed "Radio Vittoria", i.e. "Radio Victory"). He helped fugitives from the fascist authorities to escape to the western (Tyrrhenian) coast of Italy, from where they could be rescued by Allied MTBs.

Peter Tompkins was an American undercover OSS agent in Rome. On 21 January 1944 (the day before the Anzio landings), he made contact with Giglio. From then on, they worked closely together and were in almost daily contact. Allied forces were now within  of Rome. Giglio increased his activity, which placed him increasingly at risk. He supplied Tompkins with detailed reports about the police stations of Rome, and about the buildings occupied by the Germans. He arranged meetings in his own house between Tompkins and leaders of the Roman resistance: Giorgio Amendola, Giuliano Vassalli, and Riccardo Bauer. He was able to inform the Allies that the German attack at Cisterna di Latina on 16 February during the Battle of Anzio was only a diversionary attack, in preparation for the real attack to be made two days later at the western end of the Allied position.

On 3–4 February, policemen commanded by Caruso, and the Banda Koch (a gang of fascist thugs commanded by Pietro Koch), raided the Basilica of Saint Paul Outside the Walls.

Posthumous recognition

In 1944, the Gold Medal of Military Valour, an Italian high military decoration, was conferred upon Giglio. The citation reads: 

An English translation:

There are also tangible memorials. Caserma Maurizio Giglio of the Polizia di Stato in the Roman quarter of  - in effect, the police headquarters building of Rome. Via Maurizio Giglio, a street at the junction of Via Cassia and Via Trionfale, Rome. Via Maurizio Giglio, a street in Santa Marinella, Rome. A memorial plaque in Piazza Navona, near the church of Sant'Agnese in Agone, Rome. A memorial plaque in Largo della Gancia, in the Roman quarter of Della Vittoria.

References

  The English-language original of Una spia a Roma.

1920 births
1944 deaths
Italian soldiers
Italian military personnel killed in World War II
Italian resistance movement members
World War II spies for Italy
People murdered in Italy
Male murder victims
Italian police officers
Fosse Ardeatine massacre victims
Resistance members killed by Nazi Germany
Recipients of the Bronze Medal of Military Valor
Recipients of the Gold Medal of Military Valor
Italian spies